Edwaard Liang (born c. 1975/1976 in Taipei, Taiwan) is a Taiwanese-born American dancer and choreographer. He grew up in Marin County, California.

Career
Liang began studying dance at the age of 5. He entered the School of American Ballet in New York City in 1989, joined New York City Ballet in 1993 and was promoted to the rank of soloist in 1998.In 2001, Liang left the New York City Ballet to dance in Fosse on Broadway. He returned to New York City Ballet from 2004 to 2007 where he danced in ballets by Jorma Elo (Slice to Sharp) and Mauro Bigonzetti (In Vento). Liang began choreographing around 2003. He created FLIGHT OF ANGELS for Nederlands Dans Theatre and in 2005 his pas de deux DISTANT CRIES was premiered at the Joyce Theatre, NYC, by Peter Boal and Wendy Whelan and was later performed by the same dancers at the New York State Theater. In July 2013 Liang became artistic director of BalletMet the professional company based in Columbus, Ohio.

Awards
1993, Mae L. Wien Award.
2006, "25 to Watch" by Dance Magazine for choreography. 
2006, National Choreographic Competition, winner.
Prince Prize Grant for Choreography
Choo San Goh Award for Choreography
2008, Golden Mask Award nominee for Whispers in the Dark

References

External links 
 
 New York City Ballet: Edwaard Liang biography
 Joffery Ballet: Edwaard Liang interview (July 14, 2008)

Date of birth missing (living people)
Musicians from Taipei
American choreographers
American musicians of Chinese descent
Ballet choreographers
American male ballet dancers
Living people
Morphoses dancers
New York City Ballet soloists
Taiwanese emigrants to the United States
School of American Ballet alumni
People from Marin County, California
Year of birth missing (living people)